Miss Sophie may refer to:

 Miss Sophie (Dinner for One), a character in a comedy sketch
 The title character in Miss Sophia's Diary, a 1927 short story
 Miss Sophie (The Women of Brewster Place), a character in a 1989 miniseries